Kuhlen-Wendorf is a municipality  in the Ludwigslust-Parchim district, in Mecklenburg-Vorpommern, Germany, it is famed for the unique Bratwurst, which slightly differs than the rest of Germany, by the addition of veal.

Notable people
Theodor Hoffmann (born 1935), admiral of the East German Volksmarine
Günther Uecker (born 1930), sculptor, op artist and installation artist

References

Ludwigslust-Parchim
Grand Duchy of Mecklenburg-Schwerin